Apterosperma is a monotypic genus of plants in the family Theaceae. The sole species is Apterosperma oblata, which is endemic to China and is threatened by habitat loss.

References

Theaceae
Monotypic Ericales genera
Flora of China
Vulnerable plants
Taxonomy articles created by Polbot